Klaus Matischak (born 24 October 1938) is a German former footballer who played as a centre-forward. He scored 38 goals in 64 matches in the Bundesliga.

In 1965, he won the Bundesliga title with Werder Bremen.

Honours
Werder Bremen
 Bundesliga: 1964–65

References

External links
 

1938 births
Living people
German footballers
Association football forwards
Bundesliga players
FK Pirmasens players
Karlsruher SC players
FC Viktoria Köln players
FC Schalke 04 players
SV Werder Bremen players
People from Bottrop
Sportspeople from Münster (region)
Footballers from North Rhine-Westphalia